And God Created Great Whales, Op. 229, No. 1, is a symphonic poem for orchestra and recorded whale sounds by the American composer Alan Hovhaness.  The work was commissioned by Andre Kostelanetz and the New York Philharmonic, who premiered the piece on June 11, 1970, in New York City.  The piece has been recorded numerous times and remains one of Hovhaness's most popular compositions.  It has also been credited as an early work in the movement to save whales from extinction, alongside John Tavener's 1966 cantata The Whale.  The title of the work comes from Genesis 1:21 in the King James Version of the Bible.

Style and composition

The music contains elements of melodic pentatonicism and asynchronous aleatoricism, which Hovhaness referred to as "free non-rhythm chaos."  Specially recorded whale vocalizations play intermittently throughout the work and include the songs of humpback whales and bowhead whales.  The whale recordings were done by Roger Payne and Frank Watlington, from the album Songs of the Humpback Whale.

Reception
Larry Rohter of The New York Times said the piece "can veer toward kitsch."  Edward Greenfield of Gramophone similarly gave the work mixed praise, stating:

See also
List of compositions by Alan Hovhaness
Biomusic

References

Sources

Compositions by Alan Hovhaness
Compositions for symphony orchestra
Symphonic poems
1970 compositions
20th-century classical music
Whale sounds
Music commissioned by the New York Philharmonic